Tessellota trifasciata is a moth in the family Erebidae. It was described by Hermann Burmeister in 1878. It is found in Argentina and Bolivia.

Subspecies
Tessellota trifasciata trifasciata (Argentina)
Tessellota trifasciata bruchi (Breyer, 1957)

References

Moths described in 1878
Phaegopterina